The Santana 35 is an American sailboat that was designed by W. Shad Turner as a racer-cruiser and first built in 1978.

The design was developed into the Schock 35 in 1984, using the same hull design, but a taller mast and deeper keel.

Production
The design was built by W. D. Schock Corp in the United States, from 1978 until 1983, with 115 boats completed, but it is now out of production.

Design
The Santana 35 is a recreational keelboat, built predominantly of fiberglass, with wood trim. It has a fractional sloop rig with aluminum spars, a raked stem, a reverse transom, an internally mounted spade-type rudder controlled by a tiller and a fixed fin keel. It displaces  and carries  of ballast.

The design has sleeping accommodation for eight people, with two straight settee berhs and two pilot berths in the main cabin and two aft cabins, each with a double berth. The galley is located on the port side at the companionway ladder. The galley is equipped with a two-burner stove, ice box and a sink. A navigation station is opposite the galley, on the starboard side. The head is located in the bow forepeak and includes a shower.

See also
List of sailing boat types

References

External links

Keelboats
1970s sailboat type designs
Sailing yachts
Sailboat type designs by W. Shad Turner
Sailboat types built by W. D. Schock Corp